Franciscus Antonius "Frans" Fiolet (born 20 July 1939) is a retired field hockey player from the Netherlands. He competed  at the 1960 and 1964 Summer Olympics, where his team finished in ninth and seventh place, respectively.

References

External links
 

1939 births
Living people
Dutch male field hockey players
Field hockey players at the 1960 Summer Olympics
Field hockey players at the 1964 Summer Olympics
Olympic field hockey players of the Netherlands
Field hockey players from The Hague
20th-century Dutch people